Austin Airport  is a public use airport owned by the U.S. Bureau of Land Management five miles southwest of Austin, in Lander County, Nevada.

Many U.S. airports use the same three-letter location identifier for the FAA and IATA, but this airport is TMT to the FAA and ASQ to the IATA (which assigned TMT to Porto Trombetas Airport in Pará, Brazil).

Facilities
Austin Airport covers 1,205 acres (488 ha) at an elevation of 5,735 feet (1,748 m). Its single runway, 18/36, is 6,000 by 75 feet (1,829 x 23 m).

In the year ending August 31, 2012 the airport had 1,400 aircraft operations, average 116 per month: 93% general aviation and 7% military. Six aircraft were then based at this airport, all single-engine.

References

External links 
  from Nevada DOT
 Aerial photo as of September 1999 from USGS The National Map
 

Airports in Nevada
Transportation in Lander County, Nevada
Buildings and structures in Lander County, Nevada
Bureau of Land Management